DeStefano is an Italian surname. People with the surname include:

Sam DeStefano, American gangster
Mike DeStefano, American comedian
Chris DeStefano, American singer
Mario Anthony DeStefano, American gangster
Lauren DeStefano, American author
Anthony DeStefano, American author
Frank DeStefano, medical researcher
Joe DeStefano, politician
Robert DeStefano, American chiropractor
John DeStefano (disambiguation), several people
Fred DeStefano, American football player
Stephen DeStefano, American comics artist

See also
Ricci v. DeStefano

Italian-language surnames
Surnames from given names